Aladdin, or the Wonderful Lamp is a play by Adam Oehlenschläger. The play was published in Poetiske Skrifter, bind 2 from 1805. 

The play is based upon the story of Aladdin in One Thousand and One Nights.

Aladdin, or the Wonderful Lamp is part of the Danish Culture Canon, maintained by the Danish Ministry of Culture.

External links 
 Aladdin, eller Den forunderlige Lampe in the Archive for Danish literature 
 Omtale af Aladdin, eller Den forunderlige Lampe in the Danish Culture Canon 

Plays by Adam Oehlenschläger
Danish Culture Canon
19th-century Danish plays
1805 plays